17 Days may refer to:
 Seventeen Days, a 2005 album by rock band 3 Doors Down
 "17 Days" (song), a 1984 song by Prince